Kayıköy can refer to:

 Kayıköy, Bismil
 Kayıköy, Dicle
 Kayıköy, Refahiye